Events in the year 2002 in Monaco.

Incumbents 
 Monarch: Rainier III
 State Minister: Patrick Leclercq

Events 

 2 April – Section 1.249 of the Constitution of Monaco was revised and passed into law. This section concerns the Line of Succession to the Monegasque Throne.
 26 May – David Coulthard won the Monaco Grand Prix.

Deaths

See also 

 2002 in Europe
 City states

References 

 
Years of the 21st century in Monaco
2000s in Monaco
Monaco
Monaco